Droitwich Rugby Football Club is an English rugby union team based in Droitwich Spa, Worcestershire.  The club runs three senior sides and a veterans team, colts and a full set of mini (ages 6–11) and junior (ages 13–17) sides.  The first XV currently plays in Midlands 1 West having been promoted as champions from Midlands 2 West (South) at the end of the 2017-18 season.

History

Droitwich Rugby Football Club was formed in 1972.  The club's first games were played at St. Peter's Field, before moving to the nearby village of Hanbury on the outskirts of Droitwich Spa, where home games took place on land behind the Vernon Arms pub.  A change in the pub ownership facilitated another move, this time back into Droitwich Spa, to the King George V playing fields.  In 1984, after a number of years ground-hopping, the club official opened its first proper home at Hanbury Road.  The 1986-87 season would see league rugby union introduced in England for the first time with Droitwich placed in the Midlands regional leagues.  That year Droitwich came close to their first taste of major silverware when they reached the final of the North Midlands Cup, losing to Old Dixonians at The Reddings.  In 1990 the club introduced its junior and mini section and this would grow steadily over the coming decade.

The town of Droitwich Spa would also grow over the 1990s and this would see developers start to eye the surrounding land for potential development.  This development included the ground at Hanbury Road and by 1998 the club decided to sell it off for £1.9 million.  With the club's future looking bright thanks to this money, Droitwich moved to their current home - the Glyn Mitchell Memorial Ground (named after one of the club's founders) - which was just up the road from their previous ground.  Not long after the move, the club won North Midlands 1 at the end of the 1999-00 season and promotion to Midlands 4 West (South).

Honours
North Midlands 2 champions: 1992–93
North Midlands 1 champions: 1999–00
Midlands 3 West (South) champions (2): 2006-07, 2016–17
North Midlands Shield winners (2): 2010-11, 2011–12
North Midlands Intermediate Cup winners: 2018
North Midlands Shield plate winners: 2017-18

References

External links
 Official club website

English rugby union teams
Rugby clubs established in 1972
Droitwich Spa
Rugby union in Worcestershire